Joseph Daniel Gates (October 3, 1954 – March 28, 2010) was an American professional baseball player. He played parts of two seasons in Major League Baseball (MLB) for the Chicago White Sox.

His only extra base hit was a triple on May 13, 1979 against the Kansas City Royals. He had come on as a pinch hitter for Don Kessinger and stayed in the game and played second base. The pitcher for the Royals was Eduardo Rodriguez. The hit drove in Greg Pryor in the bottom of the 9th. The final score of the game was Royals 14, White Sox 5.

After his major league career, he entered the coaching ranks. He was the bench coach of the Gary SouthShore RailCats of the Northern League at the time of his death at age 55.

Notes

Sources

Baseball Gauge
Retrosheet
Venezuelan Professional Baseball League
RailCats coach, former White Sox player Joe Gates dies

1954 births
2010 deaths
African-American baseball players
American expatriate baseball players in Canada
Baseball players from Gary, Indiana
Chicago White Sox players
Denver Bears players
Edmonton Trappers players
Gary SouthShore RailCats coaches
Gulf Coast Royals players
Iowa Oaks players
Jacksonville Suns players
Knoxville Sox players
Leones del Caracas players
American expatriate baseball players in Venezuela
Major League Baseball second basemen
Portland Beavers players
Waterloo Royals players
20th-century African-American sportspeople
21st-century African-American people